Express Werke AG was a company formed in 1884 in Neumarkt in der Oberpfalz, Germany that manufactured bicycles and motorcycles. In the 1930s Express built mopeds and lightweight motorcycles with 75cc and 98cc Sachs engines. From 1949 the company resumed production using Sachs and ILO engines up to 248cc. In 1958 Express merged with DKW and Victoria to form Zweirad Union. Zweirad Union terminated Express production in 1959.

External links 
 Express Owners' Club
 Meisterdinger von Nürnberg Express webpages
 Hanselweb webpage with technical details of 1950's Express Radex ZX 151 model

Cycle manufacturers of Germany
Motorcycle manufacturers of Germany